Thomas Seymour Nevill (30 October 1901 – 17 August 1980) was an English Anglican priest and school teacher. He was Headmaster of Wellingborough School from 1940 to 1956, Master of Charterhouse from 1962 to 1973, and Chaplain to the Speaker of the House of Commons from November 1969 to 1972.

References

External links
 

 

 
 
 

1901 births
1980 deaths
20th-century English Anglican priests
Chaplains of the House of Commons (UK)
Heads of schools in England
Schoolteachers from Northamptonshire